Eder Kurti (born 29 October 1984) is a British Professional boxer with Albanian heritage who competes in the supper middleweight division currently residing in Woolwich, London.

Kurti turned pro in 2004 and in June 2010 Kurti was a reserve for the Super-Middleweights prizefighter competition at York Hall, Bethnal Green.

Alongside flyweight Ashley Sexton, Kurti is trained by Paul Reese at the Monster Gym in Cheshunt and is managed by London Promoter Michael Helliet.
 
On St George's day, 23 April 2009, Eder Kurti defeated Mark Phillips at a Dinner Show hosted by the Mayfair Sporting Club at the Milenium Hotel in Mayfair.

On 11 September at the York Hall Kurti won by KO against ‘Dangerous’ Danny Goode who failed to beat the count after being floored by a right hand to the body in the third round.

Professional boxing record

| style="text-align:center;" colspan="8"|14 Wins (2 knockouts, 10 decisions, 1 disqualification), 6 Losses (1 knockout, 5 decisions), 0 Draws
|-  style="text-align:center; background:#e3e3e3;"
|  style="border-style:none none solid solid; "|Res.
|  style="border-style:none none solid solid; "|Record
|  style="border-style:none none solid solid; "|Opponent
|  style="border-style:none none solid solid; "|Type
|  style="border-style:none none solid solid; "|Rd., Time
|  style="border-style:none none solid solid; "|Date
|  style="border-style:none none solid solid; "|Location
|  style="border-style:none none solid solid; "|Notes
|- align=center
|Loss
|align=center|14–6||align=left| Darren Codona
|
|
|
|align=left|
|align=left|
|- align=center
|Win
|align=center|14–5||align=left| Louis Byrne
|
|
|
|align=left|
|align=left|
|- align=center
|Loss
|align=center|13–5||align=left| Iain Jackson
|
|
|
|align=left|
|align=left|
|- align=center
|Win
|align=center|13–4||align=left| Jody Miekle
|
|
|
|align=left|
|align=left|
|- align=center
|Win
|align=center|12–4||align=left| Jamie Norkett
|
|
|
|align=left|
|align=left|
|- align=center
|Win
|align=center|11–4||align=left| Danny Goode
|
|
|
|align=left|
|align=left|
|- align=center
|Win
|align=center|10–4||align=left| Alex Spitko
|
|
|
|align=left|
|align=left|
|- align=center
|Win
|align=center|9–4||align=left| James Tucker
|
|
|
|align=left|
|align=left|
|- align=center
|Win
|align=center|8–4||align=left| Matt Scriven
|
|
|
|align=left|
|align=left|
|- align=center
|Win
|align=center|7–4||align=left| Luke Osman
|
|
|
|align=left|
|align=left|
|- align=center
|Win
|align=center|6–4||align=left| Mark Phillips
|
|
|
|align=left|
|align=left|
|- align=center
|Win
|align=center|5–4||align=left| Kenroy Lambert
|
|
|
|align=left|
|align=left|
|- align=center
|Loss
|align=center|4–4||align=left| Craig Denton
|
|
|
|align=left|
|align=left|
|- align=center
|Loss
|align=center|4–3||align=left| Greg Barton
|
|
|
|align=left|
|align=left|
|- align=center
|Win
|align=center|4–2||align=left| David Pearson
|
|
|
|align=left|
|align=left|
|- align=center
|Loss
|align=center|3–2||align=left| Stuart Brookes
|
|
|
|align=left|
|align=left|
|- align=center
|Loss
|align=center|3–1||align=left| J. J. Ojuederie
|
|
|
|align=left|
|align=left|
|- align=center
|Win
|align=center|3–0||align=left| Ojay Abrahams
|
|
|
|align=left|
|align=left|
|- align=center
|Win
|align=center|2–0||align=left| Craig Lynch
|
|
|
|align=left|
|align=left|
|- align=center
|Win
|align=center|1–0||align=left| Cafu Santos
|
|
|
|align=left|
|align=left|
|- align=center

References

1984 births
Living people
Albanian emigrants to England
Albanian male boxers
Super-middleweight boxers